The men's team sabre was a fencing event held as part of the Fencing at the 1920 Summer Olympics programme. It was the third appearance of the event.

Eight nations competed.

Rosters

Belgium
 Robert Hennet
 Pierre Calle
 Léon Tom
 Alexis Simonson
 Robert Feyerick
 Charles Delporte
 Harry Dombeeck

Czechoslovakia
 Josef Javůrek
 Otakar Švorčík
 František Dvořák
 Antonín Mikala
 Josef Jungmann

Denmark
 Ivan Osiier
 Poul Rasmussen
 Ejnar Levison
 Aage Berntsen
 Verner Bonde

France
 Georges Trombert
 Jean Margraff
 Marc Perrodon
 Henri de Saint Germain

Great Britain
 Alfred Ridley-Martin
 William Marsh
 Bill Hammond
 Cecil Kershaw
 Ronald Campbell
 Robin Dalglish
 Herbert Huntington

Italy
 Nedo Nadi
 Aldo Nadi
 Oreste Puliti
 Baldo Baldi
 Francesco Gargano
 Giorgio Santelli
 Dino Urbani

Netherlands
 Jan van der Wiel
 Arie de Jong
 Jetze Doorman
 Louis Delaunoij
 Willem Hubert van Blijenburgh
 Salomon Zeldenrust
 Henri Wijnoldy-Daniëls

United States
 Edwin Fullinwider
 Arthur Lyon
 John Dimond
 Frederick Cunningham
 Claiborne Walker
 Bradford Fraley
 Roscoe Bowman

Results

Final

References

 
 

Fencing at the 1920 Summer Olympics